Arne-Johan Henrichsen (31 August 1918 – 8 March 2005) was a Norwegian philologist.

He was born in Kristiania as a son of teacher Gustav Wilhelm Henrichsen (1883–1947) and Birgit Heftye Blehr. He was married twice.

He finished his secondary education in 1935. He studied Romance languages at Sorbonne from 1945 to 1947, and graduated with the cand.philol. degree from the University of Oslo in 1951. He took the dr.philos. degree in 1956 with the thesis Les phrases hypothétiques en ancien occitan-étude syntaxique. He had been a school teacher, but was in 1956 appointed as a professor in Romance philology at the University of Bergen. He was the dean of the Faculty of History and Philosophy from 1959 to 1961, and rector of the University of Bergen from 1972 to 1977.

He was deputy chairman of NAVF from 1966 to 1969, and was acting chairman for a year. Henrichsen was a member of Åsane municipal council from 1964 to 1965. He was decorated as a Knight, First Class of the Order of St. Olav in 1977. He died in March 2005.

References

1918 births
2005 deaths
Academics from Oslo
Norwegian educators
Norwegian philologists
Norwegian expatriates in France
University of Oslo alumni
Academic staff of the University of Bergen
Rectors of the University of Bergen
Politicians from Bergen
20th-century Norwegian educators
20th-century philologists